Viggbyholm is a neighborhood in Täby Municipality, in Greater Stockholm, Sweden. It is located in the northeast of the municipality, bordering Stora Värtan, an inlet of the Baltic Sea. To the north it borders on Hägernäs, to the west Gribbylund and to the south Näsby Park. Viggbyholm is divided into a northern and a southern district by the E18 motorway. 

Metropolitan Stockholm